Elpe or ELPE may refer to:
Elpe, a river in Germany
ELPE , the stock symbol of the Greek company Hellenic Petroleum